Christian Stumpf (born December 24, 1966 in Linz) is a retired Austria international footballer and a coach who is currently a manager with SPG LASK Linz II/Schwanenstadt.

References

Honours
 Austrian Football Bundesliga winner: 1997.
 UEFA Cup Winners' Cup finalist: 1996.

1966 births
Living people
Austrian footballers
Austria international footballers
Austrian football managers
LASK players
SK Rapid Wien players
Karlsruher SC players
SC Austria Lustenau players
Austrian Football Bundesliga players
2. Bundesliga players
Association football forwards